Soferbi Bachmizovich Yeshugov (Circassian: Ешыгуау Бацумыжъ и къуэ Софербый; born 8 February 1956) is a Russian professional football coach and a former player.

External links
 

1956 births
Circassian people of Russia
Expatriate football managers in Latvia
Living people
FC Kuban Krasnodar managers
FC Kuban Krasnodar players
FC Metallurg Lipetsk managers
PFC Spartak Nalchik managers
Russian expatriate football managers
Russian football managers
Russian Premier League managers
Soviet footballers
Sportspeople from Krasnodar
Association football defenders